Scaphidysderina is a genus of spiders in the family Oonopidae. It was first described in 2011 by Platnick & Dupérré. , it contains 17 species from Ecuador, Colombia, and Peru.

Species
Scaphidysderina comprises the following species:
Scaphidysderina andersoni Platnick & Dupérré, 2011
Scaphidysderina baerti Platnick & Dupérré, 2011
Scaphidysderina cajamarca Platnick & Dupérré, 2011
Scaphidysderina cotopaxi Platnick & Dupérré, 2011
Scaphidysderina hormigai Platnick & Dupérré, 2011
Scaphidysderina iguaque Platnick & Dupérré, 2011
Scaphidysderina loja Platnick & Dupérré, 2011
Scaphidysderina manu Platnick & Dupérré, 2011
Scaphidysderina molleturo Platnick & Dupérré, 2011
Scaphidysderina napo Platnick & Dupérré, 2011
Scaphidysderina pagoreni Platnick & Dupérré, 2011
Scaphidysderina palenque Platnick & Dupérré, 2011
Scaphidysderina pinocchio Platnick & Dupérré, 2011
Scaphidysderina scutata Platnick & Dupérré, 2011
Scaphidysderina tandapi Platnick & Dupérré, 2011
Scaphidysderina tapiai Platnick & Dupérré, 2011
Scaphidysderina tayos Platnick & Dupérré, 2011

References

Oonopidae
Araneomorphae genera
Spiders of South America